Viburnum lantana, the wayfarer or wayfaring tree, is a species of Viburnum, native to central, southern and western Europe (north to Yorkshire in England), northwest Africa, and southwestern Asia. The vigorous deciduous European treelike shrub is common along waysides.

Description
The leaves are opposite, simple oval to lanceolate,  Long and  broad, with a finely serrated margin; they are densely downy on the underside, less so on the upper surface. The seeds are dispersed when birds eat the fruit, then deposit the seeds in another location in their droppings.

An older name for the plant is hoarwithy. "Hoar" means grey-haired and refers to the hairs under the leaves, and "withy" means a pliant stem.

Cultivation and uses
It is commonly grown as an ornamental plant for its flowers and berries, growing best on alkaline soils. A number of cultivars have been selected, including 'Aureum', with yellow leaves in spring.

The fruit is mildly toxic, and may cause vomiting or diarrhea if consumed in large quantities.

References

External links
 

lantana
Flora of Algeria
Flora of Armenia
Flora of Azerbaijan
Flora of France
Flora of Georgia (country)
Flora of Germany
Flora of Greece
Flora of Iran
Flora of Italy
Flora of Morocco
Flora of Poland
Flora of Romania
Flora of Russia
Flora of Spain
Flora of Turkey
Flora of Ukraine
Flora of the United Kingdom
Garden plants
Plants described in 1753
Taxa named by Carl Linnaeus